Velimlje is a village in the municipality of Nikšić, Montenegro.

Demographics
According to the 2011 census, its population was 109.

Notable individuals
 Joanikije II, Metropolitan of Montenegro

References

Populated places in Nikšić Municipality